Byrsanthus is a genus of flowering plants belonging to the family Salicaceae. It contains a single species, Byrsanthus brownii.

Its native range is Western Tropical Africa.

Species:

References

Salicaceae
Salicaceae genera
Monotypic Malpighiales genera